GURPS Mixed Doubles is a sourcebook for GURPS.

Contents
GURPS Mixed Doubles is a collection of characters intended for use with the GURPS role-playing game accessory Supers. Each superhero or supervillain character entry in the book is paired with another one, often with an enemy or a rival, but sometimes with a partner, a relative and, in two cases, lovers.

Publication history

Reception
GURPS Mixed Doubles was reviewed in White Wolf #35.

References

Mixed Doubles
Role-playing game supplements introduced in 1992
Superhero role-playing game supplements